Khem Xavier Birch (born September 28, 1992) is a Canadian professional basketball player  for the San Antonio Spurs of the National Basketball Association (NBA). He played college basketball for the Pittsburgh Panthers and the UNLV Runnin' Rebels.

High school career
Birch played varsity basketball for St. Thomas Aquinas Catholic High School in Russell, Ontario before playing out the remainder of his high school career at The Winchendon School in Winchendon, Massachusetts and Notre Dame Prep in Fitchburg, Massachusetts.

College career
In 2011–12, Birch played college basketball at the University of Pittsburgh, with the Pittsburgh Panthers. He then, in 2012, transferred to UNLV, where he played with the UNLV Runnin' Rebels. As a junior, in the 2013–14 season, he averaged 10.2 rebounds per game, which was the third highest in the Mountain West Conference, while also averaging 3.8 blocks per game, which was the second highest in the Mountain West Conference. During his college career, he averaged 8.9 points, 7.8 rebounds, 0.8 assists in 25.4 minutes per game in 69 games.

In April 2014, he entered the NBA draft, foregoing his final year of college eligibility.

Professional career

Sioux Falls Skyforce (2014–2015)
After going undrafted in the 2014 NBA draft, Birch joined the Washington Wizards for the 2014 NBA Summer League. On September 14, 2014, he signed with his first NBA team, the Miami Heat. However, he was later waived by the Heat on October 25, 2014. On November 3, 2014, he was acquired by the Sioux Falls Skyforce, as an affiliate player. On February 4, 2015, he was named to the Futures All-Star team for the 2015 NBA D-League All-Star Game. In the 2014–15 NBD-D League season, he averaged 11.1 points per game, 9.5 rebounds per game, 1.2 assists per game, 1.8 blocks per game, and 0.7 steals per game, in 52 games played.

Uşak Sportif (2015–2016)
On June 30, 2015, Birch signed to play in Turkey, with Uşak Sportif of the Turkish Super League (BSL). The following month, he joined the Brooklyn Nets for the 2015 Orlando Summer League and the New Orleans Pelicans for the 2015 Las Vegas Summer League. He went on to play with Uşak during the 2015–16 season, and he averaged 27.0 minutes, 10.5 points, 9.1 rebounds, 0.5 assists, 1.3 blocks, and 0.5 steals per game, in 32 games played in the Turkish Super League 2015–16 season.

Olympiacos (2016–2017)
On June 14, 2016, Birch signed to play in Greece, on a 2-year €1.1 million net income contract, with the defending Greek Basket League champions, Olympiacos. With Olympiacos, he averaged 15.7 minutes, 5.7 points, 5.0 rebounds, 0.4 assists, 0.8 blocks, and 0.6 steals per game, in 33 games played in the Greek Basket League 2016–17 season. He also averaged 18.1 minutes, 7.3 points, 5.6 rebounds, 0.3 assists, 1.0 blocks, and 0.5 steals per game, in 37 games played in the EuroLeague 2016–17 season.

On July 10, 2017, Birch opted out of his contract with Olympiacos, in order to sign in the NBA.

Orlando Magic (2017–2021)
On July 27, 2017, Birch signed with the Orlando Magic. 

On March 14, 2019, Birch recorded a double-double, tying his career-high with 13 points, 11 rebounds, one assist, and two steals in a 120–91 win against the Cleveland Cavaliers. 

On July 10, 2019, Birch re-signed with the Magic on a 2-year contract.

On March 26, 2021, Birch had his best game of his career when he netted new career-highs with 14 points, 15 rebounds and four steals with four assists and two blocks in a 112–105 loss to the Portland Trail Blazers.

On April 8, 2021, Birch was waived by the Magic.

Toronto Raptors (2021–2023)
On April 10, 2021, Birch signed with the Toronto Raptors for the remainder of the 2020-21 season. On April 11, 2021, Birch made his debut with the Raptors, getting four points and five rebounds in 18 minutes of action during a 102–96 loss to the New York Knicks. On April 14, 2021, Birch tied his career-high with 14 points, six rebounds, one assist, one steal and two blocks in a 117–112 win against the San Antonio Spurs. On April 26, 2021, Birch tied his career-high again with 14 points, six rebounds, one assist, two steals and two blocks in a 112–96 win against the Cleveland Cavaliers. The next day, Birch had his first double-double with the Raptors, getting 13 points and 14 rebounds, nine of which were offensive rebounds, in a 116–103 loss against the Brooklyn Nets. On April 29, 2021, Birch scored a career-high 20 points, making a career-high two three-pointers while adding nine rebounds, four assists, two steals and a block in a 121–111 loss to the Denver Nuggets.

On August 6, 2021, Birch re-signed with the Raptors for 3 years and just over $20 million, keeping him with the team through the 2023–24 season.

San Antonio Spurs (2023–present)
On February 9, 2023, Birch was traded, alongside a 2024 first-round pick and two future second-round picks, to the San Antonio Spurs in exchange for Jakob Poeltl.

Canadian national team
Birch was a member of the junior national teams of Canada. With Canada's Under-18 junior national team, he played at the 2010 FIBA Americas Under-18 Championship, where he won a bronze medal. He is also a member of the senior men's Canadian national team. With Canada's senior national team, he played at the 2016 Manila FIBA World Olympic Qualifying Tournament.

Birch represented Canada at the 2019 FIBA Basketball World Cup in China.

Career statistics

NBA

Regular season

|-
| style="text-align:left;"| 
| style="text-align:left;"| Orlando
| 42 || 0 || 13.8 || .540 || – || .689 || 4.3 || .8 || .4 || .5 || 4.2
|-
| style="text-align:left;"| 
| style="text-align:left;"| Orlando
| 50 || 1 || 12.9 || .603 || .000 || .699 || 3.8 || .8 || .4 || .6 || 4.8
|-
| style="text-align:left;"| 
| style="text-align:left;"| Orlando
| 48 || 24 || 19.2 || .510 || .000 || .653 || 4.6 || 1.0 || .4 || .5 || 4.4
|-
| style="text-align:left;"| 
| style="text-align:left;"| Orlando
| 48 || 5 || 19.8 || .450 || .190 || .741 || 5.1 || 1.1 || .7 || .6 || 5.3
|-
| style="text-align:left;"| 
| style="text-align:left;"| Toronto
| 19 || 17 || 30.4 || .556 || .290 || .636 || 7.6 || 1.9 || .8 || 1.2 || 11.9
|-
| style="text-align:left;"| 
| style="text-align:left;"| Toronto
| 55 || 28 || 18.0 || .485 || .000 || .746 || 4.3 || 1.1 || .5 || .5 || 4.5
|-
| style="text-align:left;"| 
| style="text-align:left;"| Toronto
| 20 || 0 || 8.1 || .594 || .500 || .800 || 1.3 || .4 || .3 || .3 || 2.2
|- class="sortbottom"
| style="text-align:center;" colspan="2"| Career
| 282 || 75 || 17.1 || .520 || .200 || .698 || 4.4 || 1.0 || .5 || .5 || 5.0

Playoffs

|-
| style="text-align:left;"| 2019
| style="text-align:left;"| Orlando
| 5 || 0 || 18.4 || .556 || — || .857 || 6.2 || .8 || .2 || 1.0 || 5.2
|-
| style="text-align:left;"| 2020
| style="text-align:left;"| Orlando
| 5 || 0 || 17.8 || .500 || — || .909 || 5.0 || 1.4 || .2 || .0 || 4.8
|-
| style="text-align:left;"| 2022
| style="text-align:left;"| Toronto
| 6 || 4 || 10.5 || .500 || .500 || — || 1.5 || .5 || .2 || .2 || 3.0
|- class="sortbottom"
| style="text-align:center;" colspan="2"| Career
| 16 || 4 || 15.3 || .521 || .500 || .889 || 4.1 || .9 || .2 || .4 || 4.3

EuroLeague

|-
| style="text-align:left;"| 2016–17
| style="text-align:left;"| Olympiacos
| 37 || 21 || 18.1 || .624 || – || .643 || 5.6 || .3 || .5 || 1.0 || 7.3 || 10.8
|- class="sortbottom"
| style="text-align:center;" colspan="2"| Career
| 37 || 21 || 18.1 || .624 || – || .643 || 5.6 || .3 || .5 || 1.0 || 7.3 || 10.8

College

|-
| style="text-align:left;"| 2011–12
| style="text-align:left;"| Pittsburgh
| 10 || 6 || 15.0 || .571 || – || .545 || 5.0 || .0 || .2 || 1.9 || 4.4
|-
| style="text-align:left;"| 2012–13
| style="text-align:left;"| UNLV
| 26 || 15 || 21.8 || .563 || – || .642 || 5.7 || .6 || .7 || 2.6 || 7.2
|-
| style="text-align:left;"| 2013–14
| style="text-align:left;"| UNLV
| 33 || 32 || 31.4 || .510 || – || .693 || 10.2 || 1.2 || .6 || 3.8 || 11.5
|- class="sortbottom"
| style="text-align:center;" colspan="2"| Career
| 69 || 53 || 25.4 || .531 || – || .668 || 7.8 || .8 || .6 || 3.1 || 8.9

Personal life
Birch was born in Montreal on September 28, 1992. He has three brothers. He later attended high school at St. Thomas Aquinas Catholic High School in Russell, Ontario. Birch grew up a fan of the Toronto Raptors, watching their games on television and even driving five hours with his father to Toronto to watch a live game at the Air Canada Centre. He has been married since 2018 and has a daughter born in 2019.

References

External links
Twitter

Euroleague.net profile
Eurobasket.com Profile
FIBA profile
Greek League profile 
Greek League profile 
UNLV Runnin' Rebels bio

1992 births
Living people
2019 FIBA Basketball World Cup players
Anglophone Quebec people
Basketball players from Montreal
Black Canadian basketball players
Canadian expatriate basketball people in the United States
Canadian men's basketball players
Centers (basketball)
Lakeland Magic players
McDonald's High School All-Americans
National Basketball Association players from Canada
Olympiacos B.C. players
Orlando Magic players
People from Russell, Ontario
Pittsburgh Panthers men's basketball players
Power forwards (basketball)
Sioux Falls Skyforce players
Toronto Raptors players
Undrafted National Basketball Association players
UNLV Runnin' Rebels basketball players
Uşak Sportif players